Peter Gilbert White (1937–2007) was an English cathedral organist, who served in Leicester Cathedral.

Background

Peter Gilbert White was born on 21 January 1937 in Plymouth and died on 3 April 2007.

He was organ scholar at St John's College, Cambridge from 1956 to 1960.

Career

Assistant Organist of:
Chester Cathedral (1960–1962)

Organist of:
Leicester Cathedral (1969–1994)

References

1937 births
2007 deaths
English classical organists
British male organists
Cathedral organists
Musicians from Plymouth, Devon
Alumni of St John's College, Cambridge
20th-century classical musicians
20th-century English musicians
20th-century organists
20th-century British male musicians
Male classical organists